Krung Thon Bridge is a bridge over the Chao Phraya River in Bangkok, in Thailand, connecting the districts Dusit and Bang Phlat. The bridge has 6 spans, and consists of a steel superstructure resting on concrete piers.

History
Construction on the bridge began on August 31, 1954, by the Japanese company Fuji Car Manufacturing Co., Ltd., with Sahawitsawa Kan Yotha Co., Ltd. as its local representative. A cornerstone ceremony was held on June 24, 1955. Construction was completed in late 1957, and the bridge was first opened to traffic on March 7, 1958. It was constructed to relieve traffic on Memorial Bridge, and cost 24,837,500 baht.

Krung Thong Bridge has been known to locals as Sang Hi Bridge (Saphan Sang Hi) since construction began, before it was officially christened, because it extends from Ratchawithi Road, formerly named Sang Hi Road.

Dimensions
The length of the bridge alone is 366.20 metres, with a 185.50 metre approach on the east side of the river, and a 97.20 metre approach on the west, for a total length of 648.90 metres. At its central point, the bridge is 7.5 metres above mean sea level.

The bridge has four lanes for motor vehicle traffic, two in each direction, with no divider. Pedestrian paths 2.5 metres wide run along either side of the bridge.

Gallery

External links
 Krung Thon Bridge, Bureau of Maintenance and Traffic Safety, Thailand. Retrieved on 31 December 2007

Road bridges in Bangkok
Bridges completed in 1958
Crossings of the Chao Phraya River
Dusit district
Unregistered ancient monuments in Bangkok